The Waihoihoi River is a river of the Northland Region of New Zealand's North Island. it is a tributary of the Waipu River, which it reaches close to the town of Waipu.

See also
List of rivers of New Zealand

References

Rivers of the Northland Region
Rivers of New Zealand